Lejeune High School  is a high school located on the Marine Corps Base Camp Lejeune near Jacksonville, North Carolina. The school is operated by the Department of Defense Education Activity of the United States Department of Defense. It is one of seven in the Camp Lejeune Dependant Schools (CLDS), which include one high school, one middle school, one primary school (PK–2), one intermediate school (3–5), and three elementary schools.

Lejeune High School is the only high school located at Camp Lejeune.  Its enrollment averages approximately 400 students, varying from Red Day to Gold Day.  The students are dependents of military personnel and must either live on base (either at Camp Lejeune or at Marine Corps Air Station New River) or be on a list to get into base housing in order to be eligible to attend LHS.

History 
Camp Lejeune was founded in 1941. Camp Lejeune High School (CLHS) was founded in 1944, with the first class to graduate being the Class of 1945. In the early days of Camp Lejeune High School, the school was led by a principal and a Marine Officer. With having Marine Officer as part of the faculty, certain military expectations were expected and adhered to such as grooming standards and locker inspections.

Both Camp Lejeune and Camp Lejeune High School take their namesakes from John A. Lejeune, the 13th Commandant of the United States Marine Corps. The students decided in 1944 to take the moniker "Devilpups". This reference is due to the Marine Corps having the nickname of Devil Dog and Camp Lejeune being a Marine Corps base.

The first campus that housed Camp Lejeune High School was located on Brewster Boulevard. In 1961, a new campus was built, the school moved to 825 Stone Street, which housed Brewster Middle School for a time before a new campus was built for that school. A new campus was built for the high school in 1990.  Camp Lejeune High School changed its name to Lejeune High School in 1968.

Academic assessment 
Students of the DoDEA school system are subject to two assessment standards to measure academic performance. There is the TerraNova (test) which is taken in Grades 3–11. "DoDEA students scored substantially higher than the national average (50th percentile) in all subject areas.". The other test is the SAT. The SAT is not a required test. The participation rate of DoDEA students in 2009 was 67%. The national SAT participation rate was 46%.

TerraNova results

SAT results

Campus 
Currently the campus for Lejeune High is located with its main entrance on Stone Street and another entrance on Brewster Boulevard. The school has land cleared, but continues to use the track and fields located at the current Brewster Middle School.

Extracurricular activities

Sports

Fall Season
 Football
 Girls’ Volleyball
 Girls’ Tennis
 Cross CountryBoys' and Girls'

Winter Season
 Wrestling
 BasketballBoys' and Girls'

Spring Season
 Track and FieldBoys' and Girls'
 Boys’ Golf
 Baseball
 Girls' Softball

Principals 
 Kerstetter, 1944–1945
 Powell, 1945–1946
 R.C. Beemon, 1946–1947
 Benjamin A. Barringer, 1947–1958
 B.R. Oliver, 1958–1959
 George Durr, 1959–1966
 Conrad Sloan, 1966–1972
 Duane Linker, 1972–1976
 H.S. Parker, 1976–1985
 Tom Hagar, 1985–1991
 Rick Scroggs, 1991–1994
 Brenda Johnson, 1994–2002
 Martha Brown, 2002–2004
 Dan Osgood, 2004–2007
 Wyonia Chevis, 2007–2010
 Eric Steimel, 2010–2019
 Dana Sutherland, 2019–present

References

External links 
 Lejeune Alumni.  Retrieved 2006-08-26.
 

Public high schools in North Carolina
Jacksonville, North Carolina
Department of Defense Education Activity
Educational institutions established in 1944
School buildings completed in 1990
Schools in Onslow County, North Carolina
1944 establishments in North Carolina